Glyncorrwg railway station served the village of Glyncorrwg, in the historic county of Glamorganshire, Wales, from 1918 to  the 1960s on the South Wales Mineral Railway.

History 
The station was opened in March 1918 by the South Wales Mineral Railway. To the east was a siding that served a mine. The station closed to passengers on 22 September 1930 and closed to goods traffic in the 1960s.

References

External links 

Disused railway stations in Neath Port Talbot
Railway stations in Great Britain opened in 1918
Railway stations in Great Britain closed in 1930
1918 establishments in Wales